Martin France (born 1964) is one of the top jazz drummers in the UK. He has recorded on over 100 albums and is a Professor at the Royal Academy of Music in London. He is sponsored by Paiste cymbals

Career
France began performing at the age of twelve with singers in Working Men's clubs and organ trios in Manchester, England. After moving to London in 1983, he began his recording career for ECM. He has been active for many years as a studio musician in London, performing on recording sessions for European and American films and television . He is involved in composing music for KPM/EMI in London which has been used for worldwide TV and commercial broadcast.

His use of electronic and sequenced drums and percussion has resulted in performances and recording sessions for many musicians. He released two albums with his band Spin Marvel. They performed at Cheltenham Jazz Festival in the UK with the line up featuring Nils-Petter Molvaer and John Paul Jones of Led Zeppelin. He is a regular performer with NDR Big Band in Hamburg.

He has been invited to perform with the ASKO Ensemble, BBC Big Band, BBC Concert Orchestra, BBC National Orchestra of Wales, BBC Philharmonic, Bergen Big Band, Britten Sinfonia, DR Big Band, Duisburg Philharmonic, hr-Bigband, Royal Liverpool Philharmonic, City of London Sinfonia, London Sinfonietta, London Symphony Orchestra, Luxembourg Philharmonic Orchestra, MDR Leipzig Radio Symphony Orchestra, Royal Scottish National Orchestra, and WDR Symphony Orchestra Cologne.

He has worked with Eivind Aarset, Arild Andersen, Victor Bailey, Django Bates, David Binney, Liane Carroll, Elvis Costello, Palle Danielsson, John Dankworth, Sidsel Endresen, Paul Englishby, Mark Feldman, Mike Gibbs, Arve Henriksen, Charles Hazlewood, Dave Holland, Marc Johnson, John Paul Jones, Anders Jormin, Lee Konitz, Joe Lovano, Joanna MacGregor, Charlie Mariano, Claire Martin, Bob Mintzer, Nils Petter Molvær, Evan Parker, Jason Rebello, Adam Rogers, Maria Schneider, Gwilym Simcock, J. Peter Schwalm, John Surman, Steve Swallow, June Tabor, Ralph Towner, Stephen Warbeck, Bugge Wesseltoft, Kenny Wheeler, Norma Winstone, and Yazz Ahmed.

References

External links
 Official website
 All About Jazz article
 Spin Marvel article
 Zildjian article
 Sound on Sound: software sampling
 Jazzwise bio
 Interview with Martin France
 BBC Masterclass with Martin France

1964 births
English jazz drummers
Living people
British male drummers
Musicians from Kent
People from Rainham, Kent
British male jazz musicians
Delightful Precipice members
Human Chain members
ECM Records artists
Edition Records artists
Basho Records artists